Kuntala Waterfall is a waterfall of Telengana state in India, located on Kadam river in Neradigonda mandal of Adilabad district. It is the highest waterfall in the state with a height of 50 meters.

These waterfalls are in the dense forests inhabited by the Gonds. Kunta in Gondi and Telugu means pond. Kuntalu means several ponds. The waterfall originates from a confluence of several ponds that lead to the river Kadem.

Formed by the Kadam River, Kuntala falls cascades down through two steps and can be seen as two separate adjacent falls after the peak rains. It is one of the famous one day outings from Hyderabad. There is a motorable road until the entry point of the falls, from where steps are available to reach the bottom of the falls. The falls are about 10 minutes (one way) walk from the entry point.

Transportation
Public transport is available upto Kuntala waterfalls from Hyderabad with pick up points at MGBS,JBS, BOWENPALLY, SUCHITRA, KOMPALLY,provided by Telangana State Road Transport Corporation on Saturdays and Sundays,the TSRTC services commenced on 3/9/2022. Online bookings for the Kuntala waterfalls package can be made on www.tsrtconline.in and service no. 99999 (Super luxury bus, non ac 2+2 seater)which includes a visit to Pochera waterfalls also. Bus facility is available from Nizamabad,Adilabad,Nirmal Bus Stations also every Sunday. Service nos. are 99969(Express bus) from Nizamabad which starts at 8am every Sunday and service no. 77099 which starts from Adilabad bus station at 8am every Sunday.Nirmal and Adilabad are base stations. The nearest Railway station is Adilabad, from Hyderabad Krishna Express will reach. Other waterfalls in the area include Gayatri Waterfalls and Pochera Falls.

References

External links

Waterfalls of Telangana
Nirmal district